The Harveian Oration is a yearly lecture held at the Royal College of Physicians of London. It was instituted in 1656 by William Harvey, discoverer of the systemic circulation. Harvey made financial provision for the college to hold an annual feast on St. Luke's Day (18 October) at which an oration would be delivered in Latin to praise the college's benefactors and to exhort the Fellows and Members of this college to search and study out the secrets of nature by way of experiment. Until 1865, the Oration was given in Latin, as Harvey had specified, and known as the Oratio anniversaria; but it was thereafter spoken in English. Many of the lectures were published in book form.

Lecturers (incomplete list)

1656–1700

1656 Edward Emily
1657 Edmund Wilson
1659 Daniel Whistler
1660 Thomas Coxe
1661 Edward Greaves
1662 Charles Scarburgh
1663 Christopher Terne
1664 Nathan Paget
1665 Samuel Collins 
1666-1678 No Orations due to rebuilding following Great Fire of London 
1679 Thomas Millington
1680 Walter Charleton
1681 George Rogers
1682 Samuel Collins 
1683 Nathaniel Hodges
1684 Thomas Alvey
1685-1687 No Oration 
1688 Henry Paman
1689-1693 No Oration 
1694 Charles Goodall
1695-1696 No Oration 
1697 Samuel Garth
1698 No Oration 
1699 Walter Harris 
1700 No Oration

1701–1800

1701 Walter Charleton
1702 Walter Charleton
1703 No Oration 
1704 Edward Hulse
1705 Walter Charleton
1706 Walter Charleton
1707 Walter Harris 
1708 Josiah Clerk
1709 Charles Goodall
1710 No Oration 
1711 George Colebrook
1712 No Oration 
1713 Walter Harris 
1714-1718 No Oration 
1719 Thomas Pellett
1720 John Freind
1721 John Hawys 
1722 Henry Plumptre
1723 Richard Mead, Status of Greek and Roman physicians 
1724 Richard Hale
1725 Richard Tyson
1726 Walter Harris 
1727 John Arbuthnot
1728 Charles Bale 
1729 Pierce Dod
1730 No Oration
1731 Noel Broxholme
1732 Ralph Bouchier 
1733 William Wood 
1734 John Hollings, Status Humanæ Naturæ expositus in Oratione coram Medicis Londinensibus habita
1735 Edward Wilmot
1736 Matthew Lee
1737 James Monro
1738 John Newington
1739 Frank Nicholls
1740 Simon Burton  
1741 Robert Hopwood 
1742 Benjamin Hoadly
1743 Robert Bankes
1744 Ambrose Dawson
1745 Charles Cotes 
1746 William Battie
1747 James Hawley 
1748 Thomas Lawrence
1749 Charles Feake
1750 William Heberden
1751 William Browne
1752 Edward Milward
1753 William Coxe  
1754 John Thomas Batt 
1755 Robert Taylor, smallpox inoculation 
1756 Richard Conyers 
1757 John Monro
1758 Anthony Askew
1759 Mark Akenside
1760 Richard Brocklesby
1761 George Baker
1762 Anthony Askew
1763 Charlton Wollaston
1764 William Cadogan
1765 Thomas Heald
1766 Wilkinson Blanshard  
1767 No Oration (Licentiate rebellion)
1768 Richard Warren
1769 Swithen Adee 
1770 Anthony Relhan
1771 John Green  
1772 John Lewis Petit  
1773 John Turton  
1774 Richard Jebb
1775 Donald Monro
1776 Henry Revell Reynolds
1777 Richard Wright  
1778 Lucas Pepys
1779 John Burges
1780 John Rawlinson
1781 Richard Budd
1782 Francis Milman
1783 Isaac Pennington
1784 John Parsons
1785 James Hervey
1786 David Pitcairn  
1787 Francis Riollay  
1788 Martin Wall
1789 James Robertson Barclay  
1790 John Ash
1791 George Fordyce
1792 William Cadogan
1793 John Carmichael Smyth 
1794 John Latham
1795 John Mayo
1796 William Saunders
1797 Robert Bourne
1798 Matthew Baillie
1799 Thomas Monro
1800 Henry Halford

1801–1900

1801 Edward Roberts  
1802 Henry Ainslie
1803 George Paulet Morris 
1804 Arthur Daniel Stone 
1805 Sir Christopher Pegge
1806 Christopher Robert Pemberton
1807 Paggen William Mayo
1808 Richard Powell
1809 William Heberden the Younger
1810 Robert Willis
1811
1812 Dr Ash 
1813
1814 Charles Gower  
1815 William George Maton
1816 James Haworth  
1817 George Smith Gibbes
1818 William Lambe  
1819 John Johnstone
1820 Charles Price  
1821 George Gilbert Currey  
1822 Thomas Turner  
1823 
1824
1825 Henry Halford
1826 Pelham Warren
1827 Robert Bree
1828 John Cooke  
1829 Clement Hue  
1830 John Bright
1831 No Oration due to illness 
1832 James Tattersall  
1833 John Ayrton Paris
1834 Edward Thomas Monro
1835 Henry Halford
1836 John Kidd
1837 John Haviland
1838 William Newbigging
1839 Peter Mere Latham
1840 Charles Badham
1841 Thomas Mayo
1842 No Oration 
1843 William King
1844 James Adey Ogle
1845 Charles Daubeny  
1846 John Elliotson, on hypnotism 
1847 Henry Herbert Southey,Dr. Ramadge and the Harveian Oration
1848 Francis Hawkins 
1849 John Carr Badeley  
1850 James Arthur Wilson
1851 John Spurgin
1852 Richard Formby
1853 No Oration 
1854 James Alderson
1856 George Hamilton Roe
1857 James Copland
1858 George Edward Wilmot Wood 
1859 Charles James Berridge Aldis
1860 William Emmanuel Page
1861 Charles Bell
1862 No Oration 
1863 A. J. Sutherland
1864 Robert Lee (Last in Latin)
1865 Henry Wentworth Acland
1866 George Edward Paget
1867 James Alderson
1868 No Oration 
1869 George Owen Rees
1870 William Withey Gull Attack on the Theory of Vitality
1871 Thomas King Chambers "Restorative Medicine."  
1872 Arthur Farre "Analysis of Harvey’s Exercises on generation."/>
1873 George Rolleston
1874 Charles West
1875 William Guy
1876 William Jenner
1877 Edward Henry Sieveking
1878 John Scott Burdon-Sanderson
1879 Samuel Wilks
1880 John William Ogle
1881 Andrew Whyte Barclay
1882 George Johnson, "Cesalpino and Harvey" 
1883 Samuel Osborne Habershon "The advancement of science by experimental research."
1884 John Russell Reynolds
1885 Richard Quain, History and Progress of Medicine
1886 Frederick William Pavy
1887 William H. Stone
1888 Peter Wallwork Latham, Blood Changes in Disease 
1889 James Edward Pollock, Progress of Science and Sanitation 
1890 James Andrew, Conditions of the Pulmonary Circulation 
1891 William Howship Dickinson, Harvey in Ancient and Modern Medicine
1892 John Henry Bridges, "Harvey and his successors"  
1893 Philip Henry Pye-Smith, Pathology as the Basis of Rational Medicine 
1894 Thomas Lauder Brunton, Modern Developments of Harvey's Work 
1895 William Selby Church, The Rise of Physiology in England 
1896 Joseph Frank Payne, Harvey and Galen 
1897 William Roberts, On Science and Modern Civilisation 
1898 Dyce Duckworth, The Influence of Character and Right Judgment in Medicine
1899 George Vivian Poore  
1900 Thomas Clifford Allbutt, Science and Medieval Thought

1901–2000

1901 Norman Moore
1902 David Ferrier, The Heart and Nervous System
1903 William Henry Allchin, On the Study of Structure in Relation to Function 
1904 Richard Caton, I-Em-Hotep and Ancient Egyptian Medicine: Prevention of Valvular Disease
1905 Frederick T. Roberts
1906 William Osler, The Growth of Truth as Illustrated in the Discovery of the Circulation of the Blood 
1907 Frederick Taylor, "The need of research in medicine "  
1908 Joseph Arderne Ormerod, On Heredity in relation to Disease
1909 George Henry Savage, On Experimental Psychology and Hypnotism 
1910 Horatio Bryan Donkin, On Inheritance of Mental Characters
1911 C. Theodore Williams, On Old and New Views on the Treatment of Consumption
1912 Sir James Goodhart, 1st Baronet, The Passing of Morbid Anatomy 
1913 John Mitchell Bruce, The Influence of Harvey's Work in the Development of the Doctrine of Infection and Immunity
1914 Sir Richard Powell,Advances in Knowledge Regarding the Circulation and Attributes of the Blood Since Harvey's time 
1915 Sidney Coupland, Observations on the Statistics in Regard to Mental Disorders and their Occurrence
1916 Thomas Barlow, Harvey, The Man and The Physician
1917 Robert Saundby, Harvey's Work Considered in Relation to Scientific Knowledge and University Education in his Time
1918 Percy Kidd, On the Doctrine of Consumption in Harvey's Time and Today 
1919 Raymond Crawfurd, On Forerunners of Harvey in Antiquity
1920 Frederick Andrewes, On the Birth and Growth of Science in Medicine
1921 Herbert R. Spencer, On William Harvey, Obstetric Physician and Gynaecologist 
1922 Thomas Hancock Arnold Chaplin, On Medicine in the Century before Harvey 
1923 Ernest Henry Starling, The Wisdom of the Body 
1924 Archibald Edward Garrod, The Debt of Science to Medicine 
1925 Frederick Mott, On Heredity in Relation to Mental Disease 
1926 John Bradford, On the Debt of Medicine to the Experimental Method of Harvey 
1927 William Hale-White, Bacon, Gilbert and Harvey
1928 Sir Humphry Rolleston, Bt, Cardio-Vascular Diseases Since Harvey's Discovery 
1929 Wilmot Herringham, The England of Harvey
1930 John Beresford Leathes, The Birth of Chemical Biology 
1931 Robert Hutchison, Harvey: The Man, his Method, and his Message for us today
1932 George Newman, The Debt of Preventative Medicine to Harvey and the College of Physicians
1933 Thomas Lewis, Clinical Science
1934 James Collier, Inventions and the Outlook in Neurology 
1935 Henry Hallett Dale, Some Epochs in Medical Research 
1936 Walter Langdon-Brown, The Background to Harvey
1937 Arthur Frederick Hurst, The Time Has Come
1938 Edward Mellanby, The State and Medical Research
1939 Robert Arthur Young, The Pulmonary Circulation—Before and After Harvey
1940 No Oration due to bombing 
1941 Farquhar Buzzard, Reconstruction in the practice of medicine (Oration not delivered but published only).
1942 William Wilson Jameson, War and the Advancement of Social Medicine
1943 William Hume,  The Physician in War - In Harvey's Time and After
1944 Edmund Spriggs, Harveian Method in Literature (Delivered in Manchester)
1945 John Parkinson, Rheumatic Fever and Heart Disease
1946 Maurice Cassidy, Coronary Disease
1947 Charles Ernest Lakin, Our founders and benefactors
1948 Francis Martin Rouse Walshe, The Structure of Medicine and its Place amongst the Sciences
1949 Geoffrey Marshall, Individuality in Medicine 
1950 Leonard Parsons, The Influence of Harvey and his Contemporaries on Paediatrics
1951 Archibald Gray, Dermatology from the Time of Harvey
1952 Charles McMoran Wilson, On Credulity
1953 George Graham, The Value of Physiology in Medicine
1954 Charles Symonds, The Circle of Willis
1955 John Charles, The Contrivance of Collegiation
1956 J. Crighton Bramwell, Practice, Teaching and Research
1957 Donald Hunter, Harvey and his Contemporaries
1958 Geoffrey Keynes, Harvey through John Aubrey's eyes
1959 Russell Brain, William Harvey, Neurologist
1960 Francis Richard Fraser, The Challenge to the Medical Profession
1961 Arthur Peregrine Thomson, The Consummation of William Harvey
1962 Harold Himsworth, Society and the Advancement of Natural Knowledge
1963 Aubrey Lewis, Medicine and the Affections of the Mind
1964 George Pickering, Physician and Scientist
1965 Theodore Fox, Purposes of Medicine
1966 MacDonald Critchley, The Divine Banquet of the Brain
1967 Robert Platt, Medical Science: Master or Servant?
1968 Davis Evan Bedford, Harvey’s Third Circulation. De Circulo Sanguinis in Corde
1969 Ronald V. Christie, Medical Education and the State
1970 Henry Cohen, 1st Baron Cohen of Birkenhead, On the Motion of Blood in the Veins
1971 Leslie J. Witts, The Medical Professorial Unit
1972 Thomas C. Hunt, Digestive Disease - the Changing Scene
1973 Charles Edward Newman, The Art of De Motu Cordis
1974 Charles Stuart-Harris, The Contribution of Virology to Contemporary Medicine
1975 John McMichael, A Transition in Cardiology: the Mackenzie Lewis Era
1976 Ronald Bodley Scott, The Admirable Faculties of the Blood
1977 Douglas Black, Cui Bono?
1978 John Richardson, Harvey’s Exhortation
1979 Cyril Clarke, Nature the Old Nurse
1980 Francis Avery Jones, The Emergence of Gastroenterology
1981 John Stokes, Foreign Affairs
1982 Sir Richard Doll, Prospects for Prevention
1983 Richard Bayliss, Thyroid Disease as the Expression of Autoimmune Disorder
1984 Anthony Clifford Dornhorst, Sharing the Secrets
1985 Dame Sheila Sherlock, Virus Hepatitis
1986 Allan George Williams Whitfield, Royal Physicians
1987 Sir James Gowans, Prospects for Medical Research
1988 Paul E. Polani, The Impact of Genetics on Medicine
1989 Sir Christopher Booth, A Clinician in Search of the Soluble
1990 Lord John Nicholas Walton, Method in Medicine
1991 Sir Raymond Hoffenberg, The science and cunning of physick: physicians, patients and politics in the 1990s
1992 Sir J. D. Wetherall, The role of nature and nurture in common diseases: Garrod's legacy
1993 Sir Colin Dollery, Medicine and the Pharmacological Revolution
1994 Dame Margaret Turner-Warwick, The Marvel of the Lung and Human Responsibility - A Great Contempt of God's Good Gifts?
1995 John D. Swales, The Growth of Medical Science: The Lessons of Malthus
1996 Sir Walter Bodmer, The Somatic Evolution Of Cancer
1997 Sir John Grimley Evans, A Correct Compassion: the Medical Response to an Ageing Society
1998 Sir Donald Acheson, Equality of Health: Dream or Reality
1999 Sir Brian Jarman, The Quality of Care in Hospitals
2000 Leslie Turnberg, Baron Turnberg,Science, Society and the Perplexed Physician

2001–present
2001 David Warrell, “To search and Studdy out the secrett of Tropical Diseases by way of Experiment”
2002 Sir Cyril Chantler The Second Greatest benefit to Mankind? 
2003 Sir Paul Nurse, The Great Ideas of Biology 
2004 Sir Keith Peters, Exceptional Matters
2005 Sir Colin Blakemore, In Celebration of Cerebration 
2006 Sir Michael Marmot, Health in an unequal world – social circumstances, biology and disease
2007 Sir Mark Brian Pepys, Science and Serendipity
2008 Sir Michael David Rawlins, De Testimonio: On the evidence for decisions about the use of therapeutic interventions
2009 Sir Leszek Borysiewicz, Prevention is better than cure 
2010 Sir John Bell, Redefining Disease 
2011 Iona Heath, Divided we fail 
2012 Sir Richard Peto, Halving premature death
2013 Dame Kay Davies, The era of genomic medicine 
2014 Sir John Gurdon, Stem cells and cell replacement 
2015 Sir Mark Walport, Medicine, science and values
2016 Sir Stephen O'Rahilly, Some observations on the causes and consequences of obesity 
2017 Chris Whitty Triumphs and challenges in a world shaped by medicine
2018 Mary Dixon-Woods  Improving quality and safety in health care 
2019 Sir John Burn Prediction and prevention in the genomic era
 2020 Peter J. Ratcliffe, Elucidation of molecular oxygen-sensing mechanisms in human cells: implications for medicine
 2021 Jonathan Van-Tam Moving forwards, understanding backwards: respiratory virus vaccines, therapeutics, and public health policy
 2022 Dame Anne Johnson Pandemic HIV and its legacy for medicine and global health

Notes

External links
Royal College of Physicians history of medicine website

Annual events in London
British lecture series
Medical lecture series
Royal College of Physicians